AFC Cleveland was an American semi-professional soccer club based in the Cleveland suburb of Independence, Ohio. Founded in 2011 and playing its first season in 2012, the team spent six years in the fourth-tier National Premier Soccer League. After being expelled from the NPSL at the end of the 2017 season, AFC Cleveland folded and was replaced by Cleveland SC, who began play in the NPSL in 2018.

History

Following the folding of the Cleveland Internationals in 2010, the city of Cleveland was without a soccer team. On November 11, 2011, AFC Cleveland announced that they would join the National Premier Soccer League.

AFC stands for A Fans' Club, signifying that the organization is for the fans and created by the fans, and was inspired by the English club AFC Wimbledon.

Stadium

Kit supplier and sponsorship
From 2012 to 2013, the kit sponsor of the club was Admiral Sportswear. Beginning with the 2014 season, Givova took over as the kit sponsor.

Club culture

Supporters
6th City Syndicate is the supporters' group for Cleveland soccer.

Rivalries
 Supporters of AFC Cleveland, Detroit City FC, and FC Buffalo formed the Rust Belt Derby, modeled after the Cascadia Cup. The winner of the Derby was based on the head to head record of the Midwestern clubs during regular season NPSL matches. Cleveland won the initial Rust Belt Derby on June 23, 2012, following a 1–1 draw with Detroit.
 AFC Cleveland also participated in in-state rivalry matches against Zanesville Athletic FC, with whom they contested the Presidential Cup, and Dayton Dynamo. Prior to the Cincinnati Saints relocating to Dayton to become the Dynamo, they and AFC Cleveland played for the I-71 Cup.

Players and staff

Notable former players
This list of notable former players comprises players who went on to play professional soccer after playing for the team in the NPSL, or those who previously played professionally before joining the team.

  Robby Dambrot
  Bryan Gallego
  Riley Grant
  Alex Ivanov
  Sergio Manesio
  Bradley Ruhaak
  Nate Shultz
  Kotaro Umeda
  Matt Walker
  Shane Wiedt

Head coach history

Honors

 Minor Trophies
 Rust Belt Derby Champions: 2012
 Presidential Cup Champions: 2013
 I-71 Cup Champions: 2015

Year-by-year

References

External links

 

Association football clubs established in 2011
2011 establishments in Ohio
National Premier Soccer League teams
Soccer clubs in Cleveland
Association football clubs disestablished in 2017
2017 disestablishments in Ohio